Albion is a rural locality in the Shire of Richmond, Queensland, Australia.

History

Road infrastructure
The Landsborough Highway passes the south-western corner, near Kynuna.
The Richmond–Winton Road runs through from north to south-east.

Education 
There are no schools in Albion, nor anywhere nearby. Distance education and boarding schools are options.

References 

Shire of Richmond
Localities in Queensland